Tails of Illusion is the second album by glam rock band Fox released in 1975.

Recording and production 

Kenny Young and company were overwhelmed after the whirlwind success of their eponymous debut album, and spent a significant while recovering in Bali. The experience revitalized him, and he wanted to do more than write silly love songs; he wanted to share his enlightenment and his Bali with the world, and it's evident throughout the album, from the cover art, to snippets of gamelan concerts, to song names ("Kupu-kupu" means butterfly).

Young penned most of Fox's second album (Herbie Armstrong gets a song and a co-write) and  overhauls a song which was only hinted at on their previous album (but, evidently, was at least partially recorded): "Strange Ships". It boasts the most ingenious production move: starting with what may be a re-recorded version, soon after the solo the recording is cross-faded at just the right moment for a key change to occur naturally (as a descending chord progression to accommodate a key change between both versions). (This same segment appears, in a different edit and without lyrics, as a song intro on their debut album.) In an instant, Noosha's voice is replaced by that of a male's (songwriter Young, perhaps?) & the song's vibe changes from sunny and upbeat, to laid-back & ethereal. The alternate version plays for almost a complete chorus, until another choice point for cross-fading back to "Noosha's version" makes it sound like a natural, ascending modulation. This section gives the overall effect of switching the listener's perspective from the narrator (Noosha) to that of a passenger on one of those "strange ships", who in turn is fascinated with the narrator's ship in the distance.

"Strange Ships" is worth the price of admission alone. But other songs are just as enjoyable for the vibe they create: the America-like "For Whatever It's Worth", the jazz-pop of "Yuli, Yuli", "Kupu, Kupu" and "Minor Therapy", the slick Californian folk of "Survival" (with backing vocals by Queen's Roger Taylor), and the spot-on country rock of "Me Without You" (complete with a pastiche of The Band's organist Garth Hudson). Add touches such as effective use of ethnic music for a time-synchronized intro to "Kupu, Kupu", and you have a warm and catchy album that is truly a product of its time.

Track listing
All songs by Kenny Young unless noted.
"Yuli, Yuli" - 3:39
"Survival" - 4:17 (Herbie Armstrong, Young)
"Strange Ships" - 5:01
"For Whatever It's Worth" - 2:52
"Little Brown Box" - 4:16 (Armstrong, Young)
"Minor Therapy" - 5:00
"Lily Sing" - 3:14 (Jim Frank, Mary Zinovieff)
"Kupu, Kupu" - 5:50
"Howdja" - 3:28
"Me Without You" - 4:20

Personnel
Noosha Fox - vocals
Kenny Young - acoustic guitar, guitar, vocals, producer
Herbie Armstrong - acoustic guitar, guitar, vocals
Jim Gannon - acoustic guitar, guitar, vocals
Peter Solley - violin, keyboards, Farfisa
Kimberly Frank - harmonica, drums, percussion, vocals
Gary Lyons - engineer
Gary Langan - assistant engineer
Gary Bell - photography
Roger Taylor - on "Survival" credited for singing higher than anybody else

1975 albums
Fox (band) albums
GTO Records albums